Nathalie Bock (born 21 October 1988) is a German football midfielder.

Career

Statistics

International career
As an Under-19 international Bock won the 2007 U-19 European Championships, where she scored two goals including Germany's opening goal in the final's extra time.

References

External links
 

1988 births
Living people
People from Recklinghausen
Sportspeople from Münster (region)
German women's footballers
Women's association football midfielders
Frauen-Bundesliga players
2. Frauen-Bundesliga players
SG Wattenscheid 09 (women) players
FFC Heike Rheine players
VfL Wolfsburg (women) players
Footballers from North Rhine-Westphalia